Guðmundur Reynir Gunnarsson (born 21 January 1989) is a retired Icelandic football player who mostly played as a left back for Icelandic football club KR.

External links

1989 births
Living people
Gudmundur Reynir Gunnarsson
GAIS players
Úrvalsdeild karla (football) players
Icelandic expatriate footballers
Expatriate footballers in Sweden
Gudmundur Reynir Gunnarsson
Gudmundur Reynir Gunnarsson
Gudmundur Reynir Gunnarsson
Ungmennafélagið Víkingur players
Knattspyrnufélag Reykjavíkur players

Association football fullbacks